The 2003/04 FIS Freestyle Skiing World Cup was the twenty fifth World Cup season in freestyle skiing organised by International Ski Federation. The season started on 6 September 2003 and ended on 13 March 2004. This season included four disciplines: aerials, moguls, ski cross and halfpipe. 

In this season new discipline halfpipe was for the first time introduced in world cup. Dual moguls counted together with moguls rankings and awarded with small crystal globe joined with moguls. Both events in Inawashiro were moguls events although 15 Feb 2004 is wrongly labeled as dual moguls in official fis results.

Men

Moguls

Aerials

Ski Cross

Halfpipe

Ladies

Moguls

Aerials

Ski Cross

Halfpipe

Men's standings

Overall 

Standings after 37 races.

Moguls 

Standings after 14 races.

Aerials 

Standings after 12 races.

Ski Cross 

Standings after 8 races.

Halfpipe 

Standings after 3 races.

Ladies' standings

Overall 

Standings after 37 races.

Moguls 

Standings after 14 races.

Aerials 

Standings after 12 races.

Ski Cross 

Standings after 8 races.

Halfpipe 

Standings after 3 races.

Nations Cup

Overall 

Standings after 74 races.

Men 

Standings after 37 races.

Ladies 

Standings after 37 races.

Footnotes

References

External links

FIS Freestyle Skiing World Cup
World Cup
World Cup